Mumbai Indians (MI) is a franchise cricket team based in Mumbai, India, which plays in the Indian Premier League (IPL). They were one of the eight teams that competed in the 2015 Indian Premier League. They were captained by Rohit Sharma.

The Mumbai Indians reached the final of the 2015 IPL where they beat Chennai Super Kings to win the title.

Squad
 Players with international caps before the start of 2015 IPL are listed in bold.

IPL

Standings
Mumbai Indians finished second in the league stage of IPL 2015.

Results

Playoffs

Qualifier 1

Final

References

Mumbai Indians seasons
2015 Indian Premier League